Deon Kristofer Lendore (28 October 1992 – 10 January 2022) was a Trinidad and Tobago sprinter who specialised in the 400 metres. He won a bronze medal in the 4 × 400 metres relay event at the 2012 Summer Olympics, and won medals at the Pan American Junior Athletics Championships, World Athletics Championships and World Athletics Indoor Championships. Lendore died in a car collision in Texas, United States, on 10 January 2022.

Early life and college career
Lendore was born in Mount Hope, Trinidad and Tobago, later moving to Texas where he started competing for Abilene Christian Wildcats. He attended Queen's Royal College, and later Texas A&M University, where he competed in the school's track and field team from 2012–2014. In 2014, He won The Bowerman, which is the highest individual honor in NCAA track and field. He had won all 14 events in the 2014 season, including the NCAA indoor and outdoor championships.

Lendore later worked as a volunteer coach at Texas A&M University, from 2020 until 2022.

Professional career
Lendore's first international event was the 2009 World Youth Championships in Athletics. The year, he was part of the Trinidad and Tobago team that won a silver medal in the 4 × 400 metres relay event at the 2009 Pan American Junior Athletics Championships. In 2010 he competed in the World Athletics U20 Championships.

Lendore won a silver medal in the 400 metres at the 2011 Pan American Junior Athletics Championships in Miramar, Florida. He was part of the Trinidad and Tobago team that came third in the 4 × 400 metres relay event at the 2012 Summer Olympics in London. He ran the final leg of the relay, and held off Briton Martyn Rooney. Lendore was part of the Trinidad and Tobago team that came second in the 4 × 400 metres relay event at the 2015 World Championships in Athletics in Beijing, China. Lendore competed at the 2016 Summer Olympics in Rio de Janeiro, Brazil, He won a bronze medal at the 400 metres event at the 2016 IAAF World Indoor Championships. He was not selected for the Trinidad and Tobago relay team for the 2017 World Championships in Athletics. 

Lendore won a bronze medal at the 400 metres event at the 2018 IAAF World Indoor Championships, after two athletes who finished ahead of him were disqualified. He was part of the Trinidad and Tobago team that came fourth in the 4 × 400 metres relay event at the 2018 Commonwealth Games. Later in the year, he was not awarded funding by his country's Incentives and Rewards Framework. He was part of the Trinidad and Tobago team that won the 4 × 400 metres relay event at the 2019 IAAF World Relays in Yokohama, Japan. In the same year, he was part of the Trinidad and Tobago team that won the 4 × 400 metres relay event at the 2019 Pan American Games.

Lendore competed at the delayed 2020 Summer Olympics in Tokyo, Japan. In Tokyo, he reached the semi-finals of the 400 metres competition, and was part of the Trinidad and Tobago team that finished eighth in the 4 × 400 metres relay event. Later in the year, he finished third in the 400 metres event at the 2021 Diamond League event in Zürich.

Competition record

Death 
On 10 January 2022, Lendore was involved in a car crash on FM 485 in Milam County in Texas and was pronounced dead at the scene. A statement from the Texas Department of Public Safety said that three vehicles were involved in the collision, and they were investigating the events. His funeral was held on 3 March, and on the same day, Abilene Christian Wildcats announced that they would rename their annual track and field meeting after Lendore.

References

External links

 Deon Lendore 2014 Bowerman Award Profile USTFCCCA

1992 births
2022 deaths
Trinidad and Tobago male sprinters
Olympic athletes of Trinidad and Tobago
Olympic bronze medalists for Trinidad and Tobago
Athletes (track and field) at the 2012 Summer Olympics
Athletes (track and field) at the 2016 Summer Olympics
Athletes (track and field) at the 2018 Commonwealth Games
Medalists at the 2012 Summer Olympics
Texas A&M Aggies men's track and field athletes
World Athletics Championships athletes for Trinidad and Tobago
World Athletics Championships medalists
People from Arima
Olympic bronze medalists in athletics (track and field)
Athletes (track and field) at the 2019 Pan American Games
Pan American Games bronze medalists for Trinidad and Tobago
Pan American Games medalists in athletics (track and field)
World Athletics Indoor Championships medalists
Medalists at the 2019 Pan American Games
Commonwealth Games competitors for Trinidad and Tobago
Athletes (track and field) at the 2020 Summer Olympics
Road incident deaths in Texas